Coelomys is a subgenus of the rodent genus Mus, the mice. This subgenus is native to Southeast Asia.

Species:
Mus crociduroides – Sumatran shrewlike mouse (Western Sumatra)
Mus mayori – Mayor's mouse (Sri Lanka)
Mus pahari – Gairdner's shrewmouse, Indochinese shrewlike mouse, Sikkim mouse (Northeastern India to southwestern Cambodia and northern Vietnam)
Mus vulcani – volcano mouse, Javan shrewlike mouse (Western Java)

References

Animal subgenera